Mount Sumbing is a stratovolcano in the central region of Sumatra, Indonesia. The volcano has a complicated summit region with several craters and a 180 m long crater lake.

Eruptions
Only two known historical eruptions have taken place, one in 1909 and another in 1921. Hot springs occurred in the south-west foot of the volcano.

See also 

 List of volcanoes in Indonesia

References 

Volcanoes of Sumatra
Stratovolcanoes of Indonesia
Mountains of Sumatra
Volcanic crater lakes
Active volcanoes of Indonesia
Holocene stratovolcanoes